St. Paul's Church is a historic Episcopal church located at Brownville in Jefferson County, New York. It was built about 1820 and is a two-story, timber-framed church built of native limestone coated in stucco and exhibiting characteristics of Federal-style church architecture.  It features a prominent steeple that consists of a square base and a three-stage octagonal spire.

It was listed on the National Register of Historic Places in 1996.

References

Churches completed in 1820
19th-century Episcopal church buildings
Churches on the National Register of Historic Places in New York (state)
Episcopal church buildings in New York (state)
Federal architecture in New York (state)
Churches in Jefferson County, New York
National Register of Historic Places in Jefferson County, New York